Al-Arabi won this tournament winning its 57th official title

Final

Kuwait Crown Prince Cup
Kuwait Crown Prince Cup
2014–15 in Kuwaiti football